Victor (Viktor) Abramovich Zalgaller (25 December 1920 – 2 October 2020) was a Russian-Israeli mathematician in the fields of geometry and optimization. He is best known for the results he achieved on convex polyhedra, linear and dynamic programming, isoperimetry, and differential geometry.

Biography
Zalgaller was born in Parfino, Novgorod Governorate on 25 December 1920. In 1936, he was one of the winners of the Leningrad Mathematics Olympiads for high school students. He started his studies at the Leningrad State University, however, World War II intervened in 1941, and Zalgaller joined the Red Army. He took part in the defence of Leningrad, and in 1945 marched into Germany.

He worked as a teacher at the Saint Petersburg Lyceum 239, and received his 1963 doctoral dissertation on polyhedra with the aid of his high school students who wrote the computer programs for the calculation.

Zalgaller did his early work under direction of A. D. Alexandrov and Leonid Kantorovich.  He wrote joint monographs with both of them.  His later monograph Geometric Inequalities (joint with Yu. Burago) is still the main reference in the field.

Zalgaller lived in Saint Petersburg most of his life, having studied and worked at the Leningrad State University and the Steklov Institute of Mathematics (Saint Petersburg branch).

In 1999, he immigrated to Israel. Zalgaller died on 2 October 2020 at the age of 99.

References

 V. A. Aleksandrov, et al. Viktor Abramovich Zalgaller (on his 80th birthday),  Russian Mathematical Surveys, Vol. 56 (2001), 1013–1014 (see here for a Russian version).
 Yu. D. Burago, et al. Viktor Abramovich Zalgaller (on his 80th birthday),  J. Math. Sci. (N. Y.)  J. Math. Sci. (N.Y.)  Vol. 119 (2004), 129–132 (see here for a Russian version).
 M. Z. Solomyak, A few words about Viktor Abramovich Zalgaller,  J. Math. Sci. (N.Y.)  Vol. 119  (2004), 138–140.
 S. S. Kutateladze, A Tribute to the Philanthropist and Geometer.
 List of papers of V. A. Zalgaller, available here (mostly in Russian).

External links 
 
 Intrinsic Geometry of Surfaces — book by A.D Alexandrov and V.A. Zalgaller (AMS Online Book, originally translated in 1967).  
  Personal war memoir (in Russian).
 Lecture read in 1999 in St.Petersburg, Russia (video, in Russian)

1920 births
2020 deaths
20th-century Russian mathematicians
21st-century Russian mathematicians
Differential geometers
Israeli Jews
Israeli mathematicians
People from Parfinsky District
Russian emigrants to Israel
Russian Jews
Saint Petersburg State University alumni
Soviet mathematicians